Sally Raguib (born 8 September 1996) is a Djiboutian judoka. She competed in the Women's 57 kg event at the 2012 Summer Olympics. At the 2012 Olympic games, Raguib lost against Corina Stefan of Romania. In addition to the Olympic games, Sally Raguib has competed in multiple African Championships and the World Championships in Ljubljana in 2013.

References

1996 births
Living people
Djiboutian female judoka
Olympic judoka of Djibouti
Judoka at the 2012 Summer Olympics